Edenkoben is a Verbandsgemeinde ("collective municipality") in the Südliche Weinstraße district, in Rhineland-Palatinate, Germany. The seat of the municipality is in Edenkoben.

History 

The Verbandsgemeinde was founded in 1972. It belonged to the Regierungsbezirk Rheinhessen-Pfalz, before its dissolution in 2000. It was expanded with the municipalities of the Verbandsgemeinde Maikammer in July 2014, but this merger was reverted by the constitutional court of Rhineland-Palatinate in June 2015.

Local municipalities 

The Verbandsgemeinde Edenkoben consists of the following Ortsgemeinden ("local municipalities"):

{|
|
 Altdorf
 Böbingen
 Burrweiler
 Edenkoben
 Edesheim
 Flemlingen
 Freimersheim
 Gleisweiler
|valign=top|
 Gommersheim
 Großfischlingen
 Hainfeld
 Kleinfischlingen
 Rhodt unter Rietburg
 Roschbach
 Venningen
 Weyher in der Pfalz
|}

References

External links 
 

Verbandsgemeinde in Rhineland-Palatinate
Südliche Weinstraße